{{DISPLAYTITLE:C6H15N3}}
The molecular formula C6H15N3 (molar mass: 129.2 g/mol) may refer to:

 Acetaldehyde ammonia trimer
 Aminoethylpiperazine
 cis,cis-1,3,5-Triaminocyclohexane
 1,4,7-Triazacyclononane
 1,3,5-Trimethyl-1,3,5-triazacyclohexane